Laurin is both a surname and a given name. Notable people with the name include:

Surname
 Anna-Lena Laurin (born 1962), Swedish composer
 Camille Laurin (1922–1999), psychiatrist and politician in Quebec, Canada
 Dan Laurin (born 1960), Swedish recorder player
 Georges-Philippe Laurin (1892–1964), Quebec politician
 Joseph Laurin (1811–1888), Quebec author and politician
 Lucien Laurin (1912–2000), French-Canadian jockey and horse trainer
 Maria Laurin (1858–1920), Swedish opera singer
 René Laurin (born 1940), Quebec politician
 Rene-Georges Laurin (died 2006), member of the World War II French Resistance and politician
 Václav Laurin (1865–1930), Czech engineer, entrepreneur and industrialist

Given name
 Laurin Pepper (born 1931), former Major League Baseball pitcher
 Laurin Lyman Williams (1895–1975), US Army Lieutenant General
 Laurin D. Woodworth (1837–1897), American politician

See also
Lauren
Lauryn

Masculine given names
de:Laurin